{{DISPLAYTITLE:C15H14O4}}
The molecular formula C15H14O4 may refer to:

 O-Desmethylangolensin, a phytoestrogen
 Gnetucleistol D, a stilbenoid
 Guibourtinidol, a flavan-3ol
 Isorhapontigenin, a stilbenoid
 Lunularic acid, a dihydrostilbenoid
 Plicatol C, a phenanthrene
 Rhapontigenin, a stilbenoid
 Yangonin, a kavalactone
 Lomatiol, a quinone pigment found in flowering plants